Michael Andrew Leadbitter (12 March 1942 - 16 November 1974) was a British writer, researcher, magazine editor, and a leading authority on blues music, who had an important role in the revival of interest in the blues, particularly in the UK in the 1960s and early 1970s.

Mike Leadbitter was born in Simla, India, but grew up in Bexhill-on-Sea, England. He attended Bexhill Grammar School, and began buying rock and roll and rhythm and blues records and magazines in his mid teens, often on import from the US.

In 1962, with his friend Simon Napier, he formed the Blues Appreciation Society, which the following year led to the publication of a magazine, Blues Unlimited, the first English-language blues periodical.  He took on the role of reviews editor, and was particularly responsible for compiling discographies of major blues artists such as B.B. King, Muddy Waters, Elmore James, and John Lee Hooker.  In 1967-68 he compiled, with Neil Slaven, the groundbreaking discography Blues Records 1943-1966, and through a great many articles and discographical research led the way in documenting the careers and recordings of hitherto under-recognised blues musicians.

He edited a collection of Blues Unlimited articles as the book Nothing But the Blues (1971), compiled albums for various record labels, and coordinated research among a global network of blues fans.  In 1972 he began working for Hanover Books, including their magazines Jazz & Blues and Let It Rock, and the following year took over the sole editorship of Blues Unlimited, at the same time as preparing two books for publication.  His health suffered through overwork, and after contracting a virus he developed meningitis, dying in hospital in London in 1974 at the age of 32.

In 2009 he was posthumously inducted into the Blues Hall of Fame as a non-performer.

References

1942 births
1974 deaths
British music journalists
British magazine editors
Neurological disease deaths in England
Infectious disease deaths in England
Deaths from meningitis